Anton Blok (born 1935 in Amsterdam) is a Dutch anthropologist, famous for studying the Mafia in Sicily in 1960s.  Anton Blok was a visiting professor at the University of Michigan (1972–73) and the University of California, Berkeley in 1988. From 1973 until 1986, he served as full professor of cultural anthropology at Radboud University, Nijmegen. He then accepted a chair at the University of Amsterdam, where he remained until his retirement. For that occasion, thirty of his international colleagues and former students contributed essays in his honor, an edited volume titled as Miniature Etnografiche (SUN, 2000). Now a professor emeritus professor at U Amsterdam, Dr. Blok also spent one semester at Yale as a fellow.

Select bibliography
The Mafia of a Sicilian Village, 1860-1960: A Study of Violent Peasant Entrepreneurs. Harper & Row, 1974. 
De Bokkerijders: Roversbenden en geheime genootschappen in de Landen van Overmaas (1730–1774). Amsterdam: Prometheus, 1991.
Honour and Violence. Cambridge: Polity, 2001.  
Anthropologische Perspektiven: Einführung, Kritik und Plädoyer. With Klaus Schomburg. Stuttgart: Klett-Cotta, 1995. 
De Vernieuwers: De Zegeningen van Tegenslag in Wetenschap en Kunst, 1500–2000. Amsterdam: Prometheus, 2013.

References

Organized Crime (2003), Michael D. Lyman, Gary W. Potter.  Waveland Press: Upper Sadle River, New Jersey. 
Biography at University of Amsterdam

1935 births
Living people
Anthropology educators
Anthropology writers
Cultural anthropologists
Dutch anthropologists
Historians of the Sicilian Mafia
Scientists from Amsterdam
Academic staff of the University of Amsterdam
University of California, Berkeley College of Letters and Science faculty
University of Michigan faculty
Yale University faculty